Percy Nicholson Fletcher (20 October 1879 – 15 July 1946) was an Australian rules footballer who played with Geelong in the Victorian Football League (VFL).

Notes

External links 

1879 births
1946 deaths
Australian rules footballers from Victoria (Australia)
Geelong Football Club players